Úbrež is a village and municipality in the Sobrance District in the Košice Region of east Slovakia. In historical records the village was first mentioned in 1337. The village lies at an altitude of 130 metres and covers an area of 17.418 km². It has a population of 645 people. The village has a public library a gymnasium and a soccer pitch.

External links
 
http://en.e-obce.sk/obec/ubrez/ubrez.html
http://www.statistics.sk/mosmis/eng/run.html
http://www.ubrez.ocu.sk

Villages and municipalities in Sobrance District